The 11th Oceania Swimming Championships were held 21–26 June 2016 at the Damodar Aquatic Centre in Suva, Fiji. It was the eleventh edition of the biennial championships, and featured competition in swimming, open water swimming and synchronized swimming.

Participating countries
Countries with confirmed teams for the 2016 Oceania Swimming Championships were:

Results

Swimming

Men

Women

Mixed events

Open Water

Men

Women

Swimming medal table

External links
 Result page

References

Oceania Swimming Championships, 2016
Oceania Swimming Championships, 2016
Oceania Swimming Championships
Swimming competitions in Fiji
International sports competitions hosted by Fiji
June 2016 sports events in Oceania